Medamarthy is a village in Srikakulam district of Andhra Pradesh in India.

Villages in Srikakulam district